Achante Aanmakkal is a 2012 Malayalam-language film directed by Chandrasekharan, starring Sarath Kumar, Meghna Raj and Nedumudi Venu. The film was a box office failure. The film was later dubbed in Tamil as Narasimhan IPS.

Plot
Madhava Menon is a well respected retired police officer who has two daughters, Meera and Meena. Narasimhan. IPS, an efficient police officer in Tamil Nadu, marries Meera and Nandagopan, an officer in Kerala Police who does homework more efficiently than his official work marries Meena. They all live very happily. The state legislative election is announced in the state. There happens a twist in Madhava Menon's life. The leader of a political party digs out an old case (a police custody death of a teenage boy) in order to trap another leader in the opposition party. The case begins to draw big attention, and the press comes to Madhava Menon's house to ask him about the case because he was in charge of the police station when the boy died. He tells the media that he killed the boy. It was a surprise to his daughters and sons-in-law. Soon he is arrested and put into the jail. Narasimhan and Nandagopan joins hand and searches for the truth because they are sure that their father-in-law did not do such a thing. Also, they doubt that he agreed to have committed the crime to save someone else. Through a series of investigations, Narasimhan and Nandagopan finds the original culprit and proves the innocence of Madhava Menon.

Cast
 Sarath Kumar as Narasimhan IPS, Deputy Commissioner Of Police Coimbatore City
 Meghna Raj as Meera, Narasiman's wife and Madhava menon's daughter 
 Nedumudi Venu as DYSP Madhava Menon
 Jagadish as CI Nandakumar
 Lakshmi Sharma as Meena, Nandhakumar's  wife and Madhava menon's younger daughter 
 Shivaji Guruvayoor as Vishwambaran
Vijayaraghavan as Koyikkal Keshavadas 
 Baiju as Koyikkal Mohandas
Anil Murali as Koyikkal Krishnadas
Kottayam Nazeer as Sukumaran
Sadik as Narayanan

References

Kollywood stars smitten by Mollywood bug

2010s Malayalam-language films
Indian action thriller films
Indian family films
Films shot in Palakkad
Films shot in Coimbatore
Fictional portrayals of the Kerala Police
2012 action thriller films
2012 films